Suzuki TR500 was a Japanese road racing motorcycle manufactured by Suzuki which competed in the 500cc class of Grand Prix motorcycle racing from 1969 to 1973.

References

TR500
Grand Prix motorcycles